AD 78 (LXXVIII) was a common year starting on Thursday (link will display the full calendar) of the Julian calendar. At the time, it was known as the Year of the Consulship of Novius and Commodus (or, less frequently, year 831 Ab urbe condita). The denomination AD 78 for this year has been used since the early medieval period, when the Anno Domini calendar era became the prevalent method in Europe for naming years.

Events

By place

Roman Empire 
 The Romans conquer the Ordovices, located in present-day northern Wales, as well as the Silures.
 Gnaeus Julius Agricola replaces Sextus Julius Frontinus as governor of Roman Britain, which leads to the conquering of portions of Wales and northern England.

Asia 
 Indian Prince Aji Caka introduces the Sanskrit language and Pallawa script, used to inscribe Javanese words and phrases, to the Indonesian islands. 
 Emperor Kadphises of the Kushan Empire sends a delegation to Rome, to seek support against the Parthians.  
 This is the base year (year zero) of the Saka era used by some Hindu calendars, the Indian national calendar, and the Cambodian Buddhist calendar. It begins near the vernal equinox for the civil solar calendar, but begins opposite the star Spica for the traditional solar calendar.
 Pacorus II becomes king of the Parthian Empire  (r. 78–115).

By topic

Philosophy 
 The Chinese philosopher Wang Chong (Wang-Ch'ung) claims all phenomena have material causes.

Births 
 Liu Qing, Chinese prince of the Han Dynasty (d. 106)
 Wang Fu, Chinese historian, poet and philosopher (approximate date)
 Zhang Heng, Chinese mathematician, astronomer, inventor, and statesman (d. 139)

Deaths 
 Gaius Salonius Matidius Patruinus, Roman politician
 Vologases I, king of the Parthian Empire

References 

0078